Army of the Northwest may refer to:
 Army of the Northwest (Confederate), formed during the early American Civil War, and commanded by Robert S. Garnett, Henry R. Jackson, and William W. Loring
 Northwestern Army (Russia)
 Army of the Northwest (United States), formed during the War of 1812, and commanded by William Hull, James Winchester, and William Henry Harrison